The European Master in Management (EMM) is a 2-year general management master program run jointly by EMLYON Business School (France), Ludwig Maximilian Universität (Germany) and Lancaster University Management School (UK). The purpose of the program is to allow students to study international business from a European and global perspective.

The European Master in Management is a triple master's degree based in the France, Germany and the UK. After completing all program requirements, students are awarded three MSc Diplomas: one from each of the Partner Universities. The EMM was the first European triple-degree program.

The objective of the EMM is to prepare students for a wide range of career possibilities all focused on global business through a combination of academic periods on different campuses, in-company internships, and a unique multicultural European experience with a great diversity in the student body. The first year is devoted to general management courses, whereas the second year is dedicated to a specialization in Corporate Finance, Marketing, Strategy & Change or Corporate Development.

When the program was launched, in 2007, Aston Business School was the program's Partner University in the UK. After Aston Business School left the partnership, the program was run as a double degree master from EMLYON Business School and Ludwig Maximilian Universität (Germany) until Lancaster University Management School joined the partnership, bringing it back to a triple degree program.

Program

In the first year, students stay on the same campus (EMLYON Business School) and are provided with a broad foundation of management knowledge. Each fundamental management course gives students a broader perspective of global business, as it is designed and taught jointly by a team of professors from EMLYON, LMU and LUMS.

During the second year, students take on an elective specialisation. This is an opportunity to study at a new campus, depending on the specialization chosen:
 Corporate Finance at EMLYON Business School (at the European Campus in Lyon or at the Asian Campus in Shanghai)
 Marketing at EMLYON Business School (at the European Campus in Lyon)
 Strategy & Change at Ludwig Maximilian Universität (at the campus in Munich)
 Corporate Development at Lancaster University Management School (at the campus in Lancaster)

Students spend at least one semester in a company, on a management internship, and must write a professionally oriented Master's Dissertation. This provides the opportunity to strengthen relations with the business world.

European Master in Management Partners Companies

Throughout the year, students have multiple opportunities to contact with the corporate partners. Different companies are frequently represented on campus, either to give lectures and seminars or to offer internship and job opportunities directly to the students.

Some of the main partner companies are:

 Accenture
 American Express
 Allianz
 AstraZeneca
 Bain & Company
 Barclays
 BASF
 The Boston Consulting Group
 Bearing Point
 Bertelsmann AG
 BMW
 BNP Paribas
 Booz Allen Hamilton
 BP
 British Airways
 Cadbury Schweppes
 Deloitte & Touche
 Deutsche Bank AG
 Deutsche Telekom
 Ernst & Young
 Eurogroup
 France Telecom
 General Electric
 GlaxoSmithKline
 Google
 Honda Motor
 IBM
 Infineon Technologies
 Intel
 KPMG
 L'Oréal
 LVMH
 Microsoft
 Monitor Group
 Morgan Stanley
 Natixis
 Nestlé
 NISSAN INFINITI
 PriceWaterhouseCoopers
 Procter & Gamble
 Roland Berger Strategy Consultants
 Siemens AG
 Société Générale
 Tesco
 Toyota Motor
 UBS AG
 Volkswagen
 Walt Disney Company
 Xerox
 etc.

References

External links
 Official European Master in Management website
 EMLYON Official website
 Ludwig Maximilian University of Munich Official website 

Business schools